Bridge Square Historic District is a national historic district located at Rochester in Monroe County, New York. The district contains 24 contributing buildings that consist primarily of two-, three-, and four-story brick masonry commercial and industrial buildings.  Structures date from 1826 to 1928, the oldest being the U.S. Hotel (1826), that served as the location of the founding of the University of Rochester and Colgate Divinity School.

It was listed on the National Register of Historic Places in 1984.

References

Historic districts in Rochester, New York
Federal architecture in New York (state)
Historic districts on the National Register of Historic Places in New York (state)
National Register of Historic Places in Rochester, New York